The Electoral district of Alberton was an electoral district of the Legislative Assembly in the Australian colony of Victoria, located in the south-east of the then-colony.

Its area was defined as: "Commencing at the Mouth of Worrigall Creek on the Ninety Mile Beach Bounded on the North by a Line West Seventeen Miles to the Eastern Branch of the River Tarra; thence on the South-west by a Line in a South-westerly Direction to the Mouth of the Little River in Corner Inlet; and on the South and South-east by the Sea coast (including Snake Island) to the commencing Point".

Alberton was abolished in 1859, its area became part of the new electoral district of South Gipps Land.

Member

References

Former electoral districts of Victoria (Australia)
1856 establishments in Australia
1859 disestablishments in Australia